Bondi or Bondy is a surname. Notable people with the surname include:

Beulah Bondi (1888–1981), American actress
Curt W. Bondy (1894–1972), German psychologist and social educator
Egon Bondy, born Zbyněk Fišer (1930–2007), Czech philosopher and poet
François Bondy (1915-2003), Swiss journalist and novelist
Hermann Bondi (1919–2005), Anglo-Austrian mathematician and physicist
John Adrian Bondy, British-Canadian mathematician
Joseph Bondy (1863–1945), American lawyer, politician,  and military officer
Luc Bondy (born 1948), Swiss theater and opera director
Pam Bondi (born 1965), American Attorney General for the state of Florida
Renato Rafael Bondi, Brazilian footballer
Simon Bondi (1774–1816), lexicographer
Vic Bondi, of American band Articles of Faith
William Bondy (1870-1964), a longtime federal judge of the Southern District of New York
Yak Bondy, American music producer
 Bondy, a pseudonym of Gene Bilbrew (1923-1974), American cartoonist and fetish artist

See also
Bondi (disambiguation)